The Eleazer Hyde House is a historic house located at 401 Woodward Street in Newton, Massachusetts.

Description and history 
The two story timber-frame house was built c. 1770, and is one of the city's few surviving high style Late Georgian houses. This house was probably built by Eleazer Hyde, Jr., son of one of Newton's early settlers. Its entry is framed by pilasters and topped by a gable pediment. Its lower windows are topped by crown moulding, while its upper windows butt up to the roof cornice. The building was enlarged twice in the later years of the 19th century, but retained its Georgian style.

The house was listed on the National Register of Historic Places on September 4, 1986.

See also
 National Register of Historic Places listings in Newton, Massachusetts

References

External links
 MACRIS Listing - Eleazer Hyde House

Houses completed in 1770
Houses on the National Register of Historic Places in Newton, Massachusetts
Georgian architecture in Massachusetts
1770 establishments in Massachusetts